Organosilicon water repellent:

water solution of siliconate 
The water-repelling liquid is applied:
 To provide the surface of materials with excellent water resistance properties - the surface does not absorb water;
 To make the material frost- and corrosion resistant;
 To reduce the pollution of surface;
In addition, the treated surface does not change its appearance, maintains air permeability - material is not sweated and retains the ability to output pairs.
The water-repelling liquid is applied:
 To provide the surface of materials with excellent water resistance properties - the surface does not absorb water;
 To make the material frost- and corrosion resistant;
 To reduce the pollution of surface;
In addition, the treated surface does not change its appearance, maintains air permeability - material is not sweated and retains the ability to output pairs.
 The liquid is methyl hydride siloxane polymer with low viscosity of light-yellow color or colorless.
 It is readily dissoluble in aromatic and chlorinated hydrocarbons, and is undergone to gelation in the presence of amines, amino alcohols, strong acids and alkalis.
 No dissolution in lower alcohols and water.

The positive effects of the application of methyl hydride siloxane:

 Improved water resistance of various building materials - water remains on the surface in the form of droplets   and does not    penetrate the material;
 Increases frost resistance and improves thermal insulation materials;
 Does not prevent air exchange – the construction outputs pair outside and does not accumulate moisture;
 Prevents UV and infrared radiation;
 Preserves the appearance of the material;
 Extends the service life of materials;
 Prevents surface mosses and lichens.
Water emulsion of organo silicon the methyl hydride siloxane with additives of emulsifier, biocides and stabilizers
Solids content in the emulsion SE 50-94M is 50%. The color is from white to light gray.

Application:

The emulsion oligo methyl hydride siloxane has properties and characteristics similar with the methyl hydride siloxane. The emulsion is also used to provide various materials with water repellency properties.

However, as oligo methyl hydride siloxane is the water emulsion, it can be applied as an additive in the production of solutions and mixtures that is by the volumetric method.
 for concrete, asbestos, gypsum, ceramic, porcelain
 in the production of waterproof papers and leather;
 in the production of water-resistant fabrics;
 by volumetric method in the manufacture of paving tiles, slabs, curbs, fences of different silicate materials;
 as plasticizer in the preparation of plaster, lime and cement solutions;
 as an air involving admixture in the preparation of cement solution
Liquid is a mixture of tetra ethoxy silane and polyethoxy siloxanes.

Application
 Metal manufacture: binding agent in the manufacture of ceramic molds for precision core-mold casting; manufacture of rods exposed to high temperatures; manufacture of non-stick paints;
 Textile industry: feltproofing of woolen cloths; abatement of carpet shrinkage; antirot and antidust protection of carpets; impregnating compound for filter cloths;
 Construction engineering: hydrophobization of construction materials, treatment of coated surfaces; porosity decreasing impregnation of concrete; manufacture of acid-resistant cement;
 Glasswork and cerarnics: antireflection treatment of optical glass; application of light-diffusing coat to electric light bulbs; binding agent for ceramic mixtures, resistant to strongly corrosive mediums, with high manufacture of fireproof material standing temperatures of about 1750 °C and stress of above 127 kg/cm3;
 Coating industry: paint additives forming quick-drying, thermostable and water-resistant coats with constant gloss.

Chemistry
Commercially available siliconates include potassium methyl siliconate (CAS 31795-24-1, CH5KO3Si) and sodium methyl siliconate (CAS 16589-43-8, CH5NaO3Si). These are supplied as a concentrate in water with an active content of between 30 to 40% by weight. This solution is further diluted in water prior to their application by spraying, dipping or rolling to a mineral building material, such as brickwork, to make the surface water repellent. The dilution is clear, stable with a high pH of 13 to 14. When applied to a surface the siliconate reacts with carbon dioxide in the air to form an insoluble water resistant treatment within 24 hours.

CH5KO3Si +  silanol functional substrate OHSi → CH4O3Si + KOH

The methyl group has now attached itself to the substrata.

2KOH + CO2 → K2CO3 + H2O

The salts formed by this reaction are often the cause of white efflorescence when too much of the solution is applied to the surface.

References

See also 
 Hydrophobe
 Amphiphile
 Froth flotation
 Hydrophile
 Hydrophobic effect
 Hydrophobicity scales
 Superhydrophobe
 Superhydrophobic coating

Chemical properties
Intermolecular forces
Articles containing video clips